Vergie Derman (Johannesburg, 18 September 1942) is a South African-born British former ballet dancer.

With the Royal Ballet, Derman was promoted to a soloist in 1968, and principal in 1972.

References

1942 births
Living people
People from Johannesburg
British ballerinas
South African emigrants to the United Kingdom